Mesimeri is a village and a community of the Thermaikos municipality. Before the 2011 local government reform it was part of the municipality of Epanomi, of which it was a municipal district. The 2011 census recorded 1,831 inhabitants in the village. The community of Mesimeri covers an area of 12.825 km2.

See also
 List of settlements in the Thessaloniki regional unit

References

Populated places in Thessaloniki (regional unit)